Langhammer is a surname. Notable people with this surname include:

 Arthur Langhammer (1854–1901), German painter
 Fred Langhammer, American business executive
 Jakub Langhammer (born 1984), Czech ice hockey player
 Maria Langhammer (born 1962), Swedish singer and actor
 Mark Langhammer,  Northern Irish trade unionist
 Uwe Langhammer (born 1965), East German pole vaulter